William G. Keller (April 19, 1876 – September 20, 1963) was a private serving in the United States Army during the Spanish–American War who received the Medal of Honor for bravery.

Biography
Keller was born April 19, 1876, in Buffalo, New York and entered the army from same location. He was sent to the Spanish–American War with Company F, 10th U.S. Infantry as a private where he received the Medal of Honor for assisting in the rescue of wounded while under heavy enemy fire.

He died September 20, 1963, and is buried in Lake View Cemetery, Cleveland, Ohio.

Medal of Honor citation
Rank and organization: Private, Company F, 10th U.S. Infantry. Place and date: At Santiago de Cuba, 1 July 1898. Entered service at: Buffalo, N.Y. Birth: Buffalo, N.Y. Date of issue: 22 June 1899.

Citation:

Gallantly assisted in the rescue of the wounded from in front of the lines and under heavy fire of the enemy.

See also

List of Medal of Honor recipients for the Spanish–American War

References

External links

1876 births
1963 deaths
United States Army Medal of Honor recipients
United States Army soldiers
American military personnel of the Spanish–American War
Military personnel from Buffalo, New York
Burials in Ohio
Spanish–American War recipients of the Medal of Honor